This is the sixth edition of Copa Bolivia. This season have different format. Defending champions are The Strongest after beating in Montero 3-1 Guabirá. In the 2000 final occurred an incident when Guabira was losing 0-2 La Barra Brava of Guabira throw a lot of firework to The Strongest team and also the referee. Iberoamericana and Real Santa Cruz withdrawn from this tournament.

First stage

Preliminary round

Second stage

La Paz
 Estadio Hernando Siles is the stadium chosen.
 Mariscal del alto Qualified as the best loser

Santa Cruz
 Estadio Ramón Tahuichi Aguilera is the stadium chosen.

Cochabamba
 Estadio Felix Capriles is the chosen stadium.

Tarija
 Tarija and Pando would only have six teams because of the Bolivian Football Clubs Ranking.
 Estadio IV Centenário would host all the matches.

Pando
  Estadio Gran Cobija would host the matches.

Oruro
 Estadio Jesús Bermúdez would host the matches.

Chuquisaca
 Estadio Olímpico Patria would host the matches.

Potosi
 Estadio Victor Agustín Ugarte would host the matches.

Beni
 Estadio Gran Mamoré would host the matches.

Third stage

Qualifying round

Play-off round

Group stage
  Note that Oruro Royal withdrawal from the group as their plane crashed in Los Andes, but they'll play in Loser's Round.

Group A

Standings

Results

Group B

Standings

Results

Loser's round

The last 14th
 Mariscal del Alto Qualified as the best loser.
 The rules of the loser's round is that the 2 teams team that score more goal than the other they
'll qualify for the las 6th.

Loser's round

The last 8th

Quarter-finals

Semi-finals

Final
 For the first time  the final will be play in an exterior country and that's in Ecuador the decision was made by Bolivian Football Federation.

Bol
Bol